The 1950 Belgian motorcycle Grand Prix was the second race of the 1950 Grand Prix motorcycle racing season. It took place on the weekend of 2 July 1950 at the Circuit de Spa-Francorchamps. The event was marred by the fatal accident of Briton David Whitworth during the 350cc event. On the 10th lap, Whitworth tangled with Charlie Salt and crashed. Salt was able to keep going, but Whitworth had fractured his skull. He died the following day in a hospital close to the track.

500 cc classification

350 cc classification

Sidecar classification

References

Belgian motorcycle Grand Prix
Belgian
Motorcycle Grand Prix